Mehmet Oktav (1917 in Istanbul, Ottoman Empire – 1996)  was a Turkish sports wrestler, who became Olympic gold medalist for Turkey in the Featherweight class of Men's Greco-Roman Wrestling in 1948.

He began his sports career as a football player in 1942, switched over, however,  to wrestling afterwards. He won the gold medal in the 1948 Olympics in 62 kg class as the second Turkish wrestler after Yaşar Erkan. Before retiring in 1953, he competed 13 times in the national team. Mehmet Oktav served then in some sports clubs and in the national team 17 years long as a trainer.

References
Olympics Database
Who is who

External links
 

1917 births
Sportspeople from Istanbul
Olympic wrestlers of Turkey
Wrestlers at the 1948 Summer Olympics
Turkish male sport wrestlers
Olympic gold medalists for Turkey
1996 deaths
Olympic medalists in wrestling
Medalists at the 1948 Summer Olympics
20th-century Turkish people